2016 in film is an overview of events, including the highest-grossing films, award ceremonies, festivals, and a list of films released and deaths.

Evaluation of the year
In his article highlighting the best films of 2016, Richard Brody of The New Yorker stated, "Hollywood is the world's best money-laundering machine. It takes in huge amounts of money from the sale of mass-market commodities and cleanses some of it with the production of cinematic masterworks. Earning billions of dollars from C.G.I. comedies for children, superhero movies, sci-fi apocalypses, and other popular genres, the big studios channel some of those funds into movies by Wes Anderson, Sofia Coppola, Spike Lee, Martin Scorsese, James Gray, and other worthies. Sometimes there's even an overlap between the two groups of movies, as when Ryan Coogler made Creed, or when Scorsese made the modernist horror instant-classic Shutter Island, or when Clint Eastwood makes just about anything."

Highest-grossing films

The top ten films released in 2016 by worldwide gross are as follows:

Captain America: Civil War, Rogue One: A Star Wars Story, Finding Dory, and Zootopia grossed more than $1 billion each, making them among the highest-grossing films of all time. This is the first year that two animated films (Finding Dory and Zootopia) grossed over $1 billion in a single year, and are among the highest-grossing animated films.

Captain America: Civil War, Zootopia, Kung Fu Panda 3, Warcraft, and The Great Wall have all grossed more than ¥1 billion at the Chinese box office, making them among the highest-grossing films in China.

2016 box office records

Studio records
 Walt Disney Studios reached $1 billion at the domestic box office faster than any other studio; it reached this goal on the 128th day of 2016, beating Universal Studios' record of reaching the goal on the 165th day of 2015. Disney's previous record for reaching $1 billion was on the 174th day of 2015. The studio became the first to have five of its releases (Rogue One, Finding Dory, Captain America: Civil War, The Jungle Book, and Zootopia) from a single year reach $300 million domestically. Disney also eclipsed Universal's 2015 record for most films from a single year crossing $1 billion worldwide with four (Captain America: Civil War, Rogue One, Finding Dory, and Zootopia), setting a new record for most billion-dollar-grossing films over two years with six (including Avengers: Age of Ultron and Star Wars: The Force Awakens). Walt Disney Studios has also become the first studio to have the five highest-grossing films worldwide, and the first since at least 1913 to have the three highest-grossing films in the U.S., both in a single year. Disney became the first studio to gross more than $3 billion at the domestic box office and, with the release of Rogue One, became the first to gross more than $7 billion at the global box office, surpassing Universal's previous record of $6.9 billion in 2015. Disney later passes $7 billion at the global box office again in 2018. Disney is also the first studio to have three films gross over $400 million domestically in a single year (Rogue One, Finding Dory, and Captain America: Civil War), and the first to fill in all slots of the top five films of any particular year.
 Disney's Marvel Cinematic Universe became the first film franchise to have four of its films gross over $1 billion with Captain America: Civil War joining 2012's The Avengers, 2013's Iron Man 3 and 2015's Avengers: Age of Ultron, and the first to gross more than $10 billion with the release of Civil War.

Film records
 Deadpool became the second-highest-grossing R-rated domestic film of all time with $363.1 million, after The Passion of the Christ ($370.8 million in 2004). It later became the highest-grossing R-rated film of all time worldwide, surpassing The Matrix Reloaded, with $783.1 million. It also became the highest-grossing superhero film not to feature Batman, Spider-Man, or Iron Man in any capacity.
 Zootopia became the highest-grossing original animated film of all time, surpassing Finding Nemo ($940.3 million in 2003). Along with Finding Dory, it became one of two animated films to earn over $1 billion in the same year, a first.
 Batman v Superman: Dawn of Justice had the biggest worldwide opening weekend ever for a superhero film with $422.5 million, surpassing The Avengers ($392.5 million in 2012). The film, along with Captain America: Civil War, were the most expensive films of the year ($250 million).
 Dangal became the highest-grossing Indian film of all-time, partly due to successful ticket-sales in China.
 The Mermaid became the highest-grossing film ever in China and the first film ever to earn over $500 million without a wide North American release.
 Shin Godzilla, the 31st Godzilla film, grossed about ¥82.5 billion ($77.9 million), making it the highest-grossing Japanese-made film in the franchise, the most successful live-action Japanese film in 2016, and the second-most successful film of the year in Japan.
 The anime film Your Name grossed , becoming the highest-grossing anime film, the fourth-highest-grossing film in Japan, and the seventh-highest-grossing traditionally animated film. In China, it grossed , becoming the highest-grossing 2D animated film and the highest-grossing Japanese film in the world's second-largest movie market, as well as the highest-grossing non-Hollywood foreign film in China until it was surpassed by Indian film Dangal.
 Warcraft became the highest-grossing video game adaptation worldwide, with $433.5 million, surpassing Prince of Persia: The Sands of Time ($336.4 million in 2010).
 Finding Dory grossed $135.1 million domestically and $185.7 million worldwide in its opening weekend, setting records for the biggest domestic opening weekend for both Pixar (surpassing Toy Story 3, with $110.3 million in 2010) and any animated film (surpassing Shrek the Third, with $121.6 million in 2007), the biggest worldwide opening weekend for Pixar (surpassing Inside Out, with $180.1 million in 2015), and the second-biggest opening weekend worldwide for an animated film after Ice Age: Dawn of the Dinosaurs ($218.4 million in 2009). It later became the highest-grossing animated film at the domestic box office, surpassing Shrek 2 ($441.2 million in 2004). It became the first animated film to cross $450, $460, $470, and $480 million at the domestic box office. Along with Zootopia, it became one of two animated films to earn over $1 billion in the same year, a first. It also became the eighth film to do so during the two-year period of 2015–16, surpassing the previous record of seven billion-dollar films during the two-year period of 2011–12.
 The Secret Life of Pets grossed $104.4 million domestically in its opening weekend, breaking Inside Outs record ($90.4 million) for the highest domestic opening weekend for an original film of any kind, and became the first original film to open above $100 million domestically. It also became the highest-grossing original non-Disney animated film ever, both domestically (surpassing Despicable Me, with $251.5 million in 2010) and worldwide (beating Kung Fu Panda, with $631.7 million in 2008).
 Sausage Party became the highest-grossing R-rated animated film of all time ($140.7 million), surpassing South Park: Bigger, Longer & Uncut ($83.1 million in 1999).
 Doctor Strange became the highest-grossing single-character debut of any Marvel Cinematic Universe film worldwide with $677.7 million, beating Iron Man ($585.2 million in 2008).
 2016 became the first year to have ten films to cross $700 million worldwide, beating 2014's record of nine films. It also surpassed the latter year in terms of most films earning more than $500 million with sixteen (Doctor Strange, Moana, Sing, The Mermaid, X-Men: Apocalypse, and Kung Fu Panda 3 have all grossed over $500 million) and $600 million with thirteen (Doctor Strange, Moana, and Sing have all grossed over $600 million).
 2016 was the first year since 2000 to not have films that were among the 10 highest-grossing films of all time at the time of their releases.
 Sing broke the record of a film that never reached #1 in the US with $270.3 million, passing My Big Fat Greek Wedding ($241.4 million in 2002–2003).

Events
 August 22, 2016 - NBCUniversal completes its acquisition of DreamWorks Animation.

Award ceremonies

Festivals
List of some of the film festivals for 2016 that have been accredited by the International Federation of Film Producers Associations (FIAPF).

Awards

2016 films 
The list of films released in 2016, arranged by country, are as follows:

 List of American films of 2016
 List of Argentine films of 2016
 List of Australian films of 2016
 List of Bangladeshi films of 2016
 List of British films of 2016
 List of Chinese films of 2016
 List of French films of 2016
 List of Hong Kong films of 2016
 List of Indian films of 2021
 List of Bollywood films of 2016
 List of Punjabi films of 2016
 List of Bengali films of 2016
 List of Gujarati films of 2016
 List of Kannada films of 2016
 List of Malayalam films of 2016
 List of Marathi films of 2016
 List of Tamil films of 2016
 List of Telugu films of 2016
 List of Tulu films of 2016
 List of Italian films of 2016
 List of Japanese films of 2016
 List of Mexican films of 2016
 List of Pakistani films of 2016
 List of Russian films of 2016
 List of South Korean films of 2016
 List of Spanish films of 2016
 List of Turkish films of 2016

Deaths

Film debuts
 Anthony Ramos – White Girl
 Awkwafina – Neighbors 2: Sorority Rising
 Jharrel Jerome – Moonlight
 Charli XCX – The Angry Birds Movie

Notes

References

 
Film by year